Terricula cnephaeana is a moth of the family Tortricidae. It is found in Vietnam.

The wingspan is 26 mm. The ground colour of the forewings is greyish brown with an indistinct pinkish hue. The strigulae (fine streaks) are innumerous and brown. The markings are dark brown and consist of a basal blotch divided in a few parts and a few spots. The hindwings are grey brown.

References

Moths described in 2008
Archipini
Moths of Asia
Taxa named by Józef Razowski